The FBA 13 was a trainer flying boat built in France in the early 1920s.

Development
The FBA 10 was a two-seat biplane flying boat of all-wood construction.

Specifications

References

1920s French aircraft
FBA aircraft
Flying boats
Biplanes
Aircraft first flown in 1923